The Dykstraflex was the first digital motion control photography camera system, named after its primary developer John Dykstra.  Numerous people actually created the camera, with the critical electronics being created by Alvah J. Miller and Jerry Jeffress.  

The camera was developed in 1976 specifically for complex special effects shots in Star Wars.  Using old VistaVision cameras (for their high image resolution), created by engineers at Paramount Pictures in 1954, and hand wire wrapped TTL chips, the all-digitally controlled system allowed for 7 axes of motion: roll, pan, tilt, swing, boom, traverse, track, lens focus, motor drive, shutter control, and their duplication in multiple takes. 

Dykstra's development of this first digital motion control camera system earned himself, Al Miller, and Jerry Jeffress Academy Awards in 1978.

See also
 Motion control photography

External links
 Dykstra discusses the Dykstraflex

Movie cameras
Motion control photography